The 1980–81 season was the 70th season in Hajduk Split’s history and their 35th in the Yugoslav First League. Their 5th place finish in the 1979–80 season meant it was their 35th successive season playing in the Yugoslav First League.

Competitions

Overall

Yugoslav First League

Classification

Results summary

Results by round

Matches

Yugoslav First League 

Sources: hajduk.hr

Yugoslav Cup 

Sources: hajduk.hr

Player seasonal records

Top scorers 

Source: Competitive matches

See also 
 1980–81 Yugoslav First League
 1980–81 Yugoslav Cup

References

External sources 
 1980–81 Yugoslav First League at rsssf.com
 1980–81 Yugoslav Cup at rsssf.com

HNK Hajduk Split seasons
Hajduk Split